Ivan W. Quinn was a guard in the National Football League. He was a member of the Kansas City Blues in 1924. He later worked as a self-employed carpenter contractor.

References

People from Decatur, Nebraska
Players of American football from Nebraska
Players of American football from Wisconsin
Kansas City Blues (NFL) players
American football offensive guards
Carroll Pioneers football players
1899 births
1969 deaths